The Rapel Dam is an arch dam on the Rapel River about  north of La Estrella in the Libertador General Bernardo O'Higgins Region, Chile. The primary purpose of the dam is hydroelectric power generation and it supports a 377 MW power station. The dam was completed in 1968 and is owned by Endesa. The dam withstood the 7.5 Mw 1985 Rapel Lake earthquake with only minor damage. It was centered  from the dam.

Design

Power station
The power station, located at the dam's base, contains five  Francis turbine-generators and is afforded  of net hydraulic head.

References

Dams completed in 1968
Dams in Chile
Arch dams
Geography of O'Higgins Region